is a passenger railway station  located in the city of Kawanishi, Hyōgo Prefecture, Japan. It is operated by the private transportation company Nose Electric Railway.

Lines

Station layout
The station consists of one ground-level side platform  serving a single bi-directional track. The effective length of the platform is for 4-car trains. The station is unattended.

Adjacent stations

History
Sasabe Station opened on November 3, 1923.

Passenger statistics
In fiscal 2019, the station was used by an average of 109 passengers daily

Surrounding area
Yamato Housing Complex (Hankyu Kita Neopolis)

See also
List of railway stations in Japan

References

External links 

 Sasbe Station official home page 

Railway stations in Hyōgo Prefecture
Stations of Nose Electric Railway
Railway stations in Japan opened in 1923
Kawanishi, Hyōgo